Bishnupur Assembly constituency is a Legislative Assembly constituency of South 24 Parganas district in the Indian State of West Bengal. It is reserved for Scheduled Castes.

Overview
As per order of the Delimitation Commission in respect of the Delimitation of constituencies in the West Bengal, Bishnupur Assembly constituency is composed of the following:
 Bishnupur I community development block
 Ashuti I, Ashuti II, Chatta and Rasapunja gram panchayats of Thakurpukur Maheshtala community development block

Bishnupur Assembly constituency is a part of No. 21 Diamond Harbour (Lok Sabha constituency).

Members of Legislative Assembly

Election Results

Legislative Assembly Election 2016

Legislative Assembly Election 2011

Legislative Assembly Elections 1977-2006
From 1977 to 2006, Bishnupur Assembly constituency had two seats. In 2006, Bibhuti Bhusan Sarkar of CPI(M) won the Bishnupur Purba seat defeating his nearest rival Dilip Mondal of AITC and Rathin Sarkar of CPI(M) won the Bishnupur Paschim seat defeating his nearest rival Madan Mitra of AITC. Dilip Mondal of AITC won the Bishnupur Purba seat defeating Ananda Kumar Biswas of CPI(M) and Subrata Bakshi of AITC won the Bishnupur Paschim seat defeating Rathin Sarkar of CPI(M) in 2001. Ananda Kumar Biswas of CPI(M) won the Bishnupur Purba seat defeating Mahadeb Naskar of INC and Sankar Saran Naskar of CPI(M) won the Bishnupur Paschim seat defeating Aruna Ghosh Dastidar of INC in 1996. In 1991 and 1987, Sundar Naskar of CPI(M) won the Bishnupur Purba seat defeating Ram Krishna Bar and Ardhendu Sekhar Naskar, both of INC, respectively, and Kashi Nath Adak of CPI(M) won the Bishnupur Paschim seat defeating Aruna Ghosh Dastidar and Shaik Moquebul Haque, both of INC, respectively. In 1982 and 1977, Sundar Naskar of CPI(M) won the Bishnupur Purba seat defeating Mahadeb Naskar and Ram Krishna Bar, both of INC, respectively, and Provash Chandra Roy of CPI(M) won the Bishnupur Paschim seat defeating Niranjan Ghosh and Moaue Haque Shaik, both of INC, respectively.

Legislative Assembly Elections 1952-1972
From 1962 to 1972, Bishnupur Assembly constituency had two seats. In 1972 and 1971, Ram Krishna Bar of INC won the Bishnupur Purba seat and Provash Chandra Roy of CPI(M) won the Bishnupur Paschim seat. In 1969 and 1967, Sundar Kumar Naskar of CPI(M) won the Bishnupur Purba seat and Provash Chandra Roy of CPI(M) won the Bishnupur Paschim seat. In 1962, Santilata Mondal of INC won the Bishnupur Purba seat and Jugal Chandra Santra of INC won the Bishnupur Paschim seat. In 1957 and 1952, Bishnupur Assembly constituency had joint seats. In 1957, Provash Chandra Roy and Rabindranath Roy, both of CPI, won. In 1952, Basanta Kumar Mal of INC and Provash Chandra Roy of CPI, won.

References

Notes

Citations

Assembly constituencies of West Bengal
Politics of South 24 Parganas district